The 1988 Men's Hockey Champions Trophy was the tenth edition of the Hockey Champions Trophy men's field hockey tournament. It took place from Mar 25-Apr 1 in Lahore, Pakistan.

Tournament

Final table

Results

References

C
C
1988
Champions Trophy (field hockey)